Wonderboom (meaning "wonder tree" in Afrikaans) may refer to:

 Wonderboom (tree) a particular grove of Ficus salicifolia north of Pretoria, and eponym of:
 Ficus salicifolia, a species of fig
 Wonderboom Nature Reserve, containing the grove
 Wonderboom South, Pretoria, a suburb south of the nature reserve
 Wonderboom Airport, an airport in the region
 Die Wonderboom, an unusually shaped Boscia oleoides (Karoo shepherd's tree) beside the N9 at Willowmore, Eastern Cape
 Wonderboom (band), a South African rock band from Johannesburg